Tame Yourself was an album released by Rhino Records on April 30, 1991, to benefit PETA. The album debuted at #184 on the Billboard 200 and peaked at #165 during its 3rd week on the chart.

Track listing

"Don't Be Part of It" - Howard Jones
"Tame Yourself" - Raw Youth
"I'll Give You My Skin" - Indigo Girls and Michael Stipe
"Damned Old Dog" - k.d. lang
"Quiche Lorraine" (Live) - The B-52's
"Slaves" - Fetchin' Bones
"Born for a Purpose" - The Pretenders
"Don't Kill The Animals" ('91 Mix) - Nina Hagen and Lene Lovich
"Fur" - Jane Wiedlin
"Asleep Too Long" - The Goosebumps
"Rage" - Erasure and Lene Lovich
"Bless the Beasts and the Children" - Belinda Carlisle
"Across the Way" - Aleka's Attic
"Do What I Have to Do" - Exene Cervenka

Single track listing
A limited edition remix collection entitled "Housebroken Dance Mixes" was released by Rhino in 1991, available only on 12" vinyl.
"Don't Be Part of It" (Moo Mix)
"Don't Be Part of It" (Dub)
"Fur" (Faux Version)
"Rage" (Vitamitavegemix)
"Rage" (Dub)
"Don't Kill the Animals" (Rescue Remix)

Charts

References

1991 compilation albums
Rhino Records compilation albums
Alternative rock compilation albums
Pop rock compilation albums